John Orrell Lever (1824 – 4 August 1897) was an English shipping owner and politician who sat in the House of Commons in two periods between 1859 and 1885.

Lever was the eldest son of James Lever of Manchester, and the descendant of Sir Ashton Lever. He was interested in railways and shipping, being a director of the South Wales Railway and the Atlantic Royal Mail Steam Navigation Co. He was responsible for establishing Galway as a packet-station. He was the sole lessee of the Thames and Channel Passenger Service and wrote several works.

Business
Lever had diverse business interests, including cotton, linen, and corn mills in Lancashire and Ireland, the exports of finished products from Liverpool, and especially steam shipping. During the Crimean War, he created several charter companies with Thomas Howard to ship soldiers and supplies to the war. This wartime activity led to a large profit. He and other investors established the Galway Line, a transatlantic shipping company. He considered establishing a transatlantic cable, but was unable to do so. Lever and his partners did successfully manage to lobby for several transatlantic mail contracts between Great Britain and Canada.

Member of Parliament
In February 1859, Lever was elected at a by-election as a Member of Parliament (MP) for Galway Borough. During the campaign for his first election, he claimed that "as a result of his coming to Galway men's wages had doubled from one to two shillings a day and that he looked forward to the time when they would receive double that again. He wanted to see every man, woman and child in Galway well fed, well clad, and well housed; their children well educated; bonnets on the heads of the working men's wives, good boots and stockings on their feet, and a twelve pound leg of mutton in their kitchen ranges every Sunday and Thursday, with all the appropriate accompaniments." He was re-elected at the general election in May 1859, but was defeated at the 1865 general election.

At the 1880 general election he was re-elected for Galway, and held the seat until the 1885 general election.

He was elected as a Conservative in 1859, and stood as Conservative in 1865. At the 1880 election, Walker records him as a Home Rule League candidate, but Debrett's in 1881 describes as a Liberal-Conservative.

Lever died at the age of 73.

Lever married Elizabeth Dorning, daughter of Jonathan Dorning of Swinton Lancashire in 1847. She died in 1877.

References

External links
 

1824 births
1897 deaths
Members of the Parliament of the United Kingdom for County Galway constituencies (1801–1922)
UK MPs 1857–1859
UK MPs 1859–1865
UK MPs 1880–1885
British businesspeople in shipping
Irish Conservative Party MPs
Home Rule League MPs
19th-century British businesspeople